Fluke Corporation is a manufacturer of industrial test, measurement, and diagnostic equipment including electronic test equipment. It was started in 1948 by John Fluke while he was employed at General Electric.

History 

Fluke Corporation was founded by John Fluke in October 1953 as the John Fluke Manufacturing Company, Inc., producing electrical metering equipment.

In 1987, Fluke partnered with the Dutch electronics manufacturer Philips. Together, the companies developed the scopemeter, an instrument combining features of an oscilloscope and a multimeter. Fluke purchased the testing and measurements division of Philips in 1993 for $41.8 million. The Philips PM series of measurement instruments was rebranded as Fluke.

Fluke was bought by the Danaher Corporation in 1998. Danaher spun off several subsidiaries, including Fluke, in 2016 to create Fortive.

Subsidiaries

Pomona Electronics 
Pomona Electronics is a company specializing in electronic test equipment and accessories. It was founded in 1951 by Joseph J. and Carl W. Musarra, who were brothers. Founded to manufacture test cable harnesses for examining television cathode-ray tubes. the company started in a factory location around the size of a living room. By 1976, it was owned by ITT Industries, which in 1999 sold it to Fluke. In 2002, Pomona Electronics relocated its manufacturing facility to Everett, Washington.

Gallery

References

External links 

Corporate web site
Fluke company history
Fluke Networks website
Fluke Biomedical website
Fluke Calibration website

American companies established in 1948
Danaher subsidiaries
Electronic test equipment manufacturers
Companies based in Everett, Washington
Electronics companies of the United States
Manufacturing companies based in Washington (state)
Electronics companies established in 1948
1948 establishments in Washington (state)
1998 mergers and acquisitions